Agni is a Sanskrit word meaning fire and connotes the Vedic fire deity of Hinduism. He is also the guardian deity of the southeast direction and is typically found in southeast corners of Hindu temples. In the classical cosmology of the Indian religions, Agni as fire is one of the five inert impermanent elements (pañcabhūtá) along with space (ākāśa), water (ap), air (vāyu) and earth (pṛthvī), the five combining to form the empirically perceived material existence (Prakṛti).

In Vedic literature, Agni is a major and oft-invoked god along with Indra and Soma. Agni is considered the mouth of the gods and goddesses and the medium that conveys offerings to them in a homa (votive ritual). He is conceptualized in ancient Hindu texts to exist at three levels, on earth as fire, in the atmosphere as lightning, and in the sky as the sun. This triple presence accords him as the messenger between the deities and human beings in the Vedic scriptures. The relative importance of Agni declined in the post-Vedic era, as he was internalised and his identity evolved to metaphorically represent all transformative energy and knowledge in the Upanishads and later Hindu literature. Agni remains an integral part of Hindu traditions, such as being the central witness of the rite-of-passage ritual in traditional Hindu weddings called Saptapadi or Agnipradakṣiṇam (seven steps and mutual vows), in the Upanayana ceremony of rite of passage, as well being part of the diyā (lamp) in festivals such as Deepavali and Aarti in Puja.

Agni (Pali: Aggi) is a term that appears extensively in Buddhist texts and in the literature related to the Senika heresy debate within the Buddhist traditions. In the ancient Jainism thought, Agni (fire) contains soul and fire-bodied beings, additionally appears as Agni-kumara or "fire princes" in its theory of rebirth and a class of reincarnated beings and is discussed in its texts with the equivalent term Tejas.

Etymology, meaning and other names

Sanskrit अग्नि (Agni) continues one of two core terms for fire reconstructed to Proto-Indo-European, *h₁n̥gʷnís, other reflexes of which include *En or *Enji is the reconstructed name of the fire god in the Albanian pagan mythology, which continues to be used in the modern Albanian language to refer to Thursday (e enjte) 
Latin ignis (the root of English ignite), Lithuanian ugnis, Kurdish agir, Old Slavonian огнь (ognĭ) and its descendants: Russian огонь (ogon), Serbian oganj, Polish ogień, etc., all meaning "fire". 

The ancient Indian grammarians variously derived it:
from root aj, which in Sanskrit means "to drive" in the sense of "nimble, agile"; 
from agri, the root of which means "first", referring to "that first in the universe to arise" or "fire" according to Shatapatha Brahmana section 6.1.1; the Brahmana claims this is cryptically called as Agni because everyone including the gods are known to love short nicknames;
according to the 5th-century BCE Sanskrit text Nirukta-Nighantu in section 7.14, sage Śakapūṇi states the word Agni is derived from three verbs – from 'going', from 'shining or burning', and from 'leading'; the letter "a" (अ) is from root "i" which he claims implies 'to go', the letter "g" (ग्) is from the root "añj" meaning 'to shine' or "dah" meaning 'to burn', and the last letter is by itself the root "nī" (नी) which means 'to lead'. None of the three explanations cited above is plausible in the modern scientific sense.

In the early Vedic literature, Agni primarily connotes the fire as a god, one reflecting the primordial powers to consume, transform and convey. Yet the term is also used with the meaning of a Mahabhuta (constitutive substance), one of five that the earliest Vedic thinkers believed to constitute material existence, and that later Vedic thinkers such as Kanada and Kapila expanded widely, namely Akasha (ether, space), Vayu (air), Ap (water), Prithvi (earth) and Agni (fire).

The word Agni is used in many contexts, ranging from fire in the stomach, the cooking fire in a home, the sacrificial fire in an altar, the fire of cremation, the fire of rebirth, the fire in the energetic saps concealed within plants, the atmospheric fire in lightning and the celestial fire in the sun. In the Brahmanas layer of the Vedas, such as in section 5.2.3 of Shatapatha Brahmana, Agni represents all the gods, all concepts of spiritual energy that permeates everything in the universe. In the Upanishads and post-Vedic literature, Agni additionally became a metaphor for immortal principle in man, and any energy or knowledge that consumes and dispels a state of darkness, transforms and procreates an enlightened state of existence.

Agni is also famously known as:
 Pāvaka – sanctifier of everything;
 Havyavāhana – one who carries the sacrificial butter;
 Saptajihvi – one with seven tongues (flames); consumes the sacrificial butter very fast;
 Vahni – travelling with wind;
 Anala – as one of the Vasus;
 Hutāśana;
 Chitrabhānu – colourful light;
 Jvalana – glowing;
  Vaiśvānara;
 Vibhāvasu''' – whose light is wealth.

Other names include Śikhī, Pingesa, Plavanga, Bhūritejaḥ, Rudragarva and Hiraṇyakṛt.

Origins

There are many theories about the origins of the god Agni, some tracing it to Indo-European mythologies, others tracing to mythologies within the Indian tradition.

The origin myth found in many Indo-European cultures is one of a bird, or bird like being, that carries or brings fire from the gods to mankind. Alternatively, this messenger brings an elixir of immortality from heaven to earth. In either case, the bird returns everyday with sacrificial offerings for the gods, but sometimes the bird hides or disappears without trace. Agni is molded in similar mythical themes, in some hymns with the phrase the "heavenly bird that flies".

The earliest layers of the Vedic texts of Hinduism, such as section 6.1 of Kaṭhaka Saṃhitā and section 1.8.1 of Maitrāyaṇī Saṃhitā state that the universe began with nothing, neither night nor day existed, what existed was just Prajāpati (also referred to as Brahman). Agni originated from the forehead of Prajāpati, assert these texts. With the creation of Agni came light, and with that were created day and night. Agni, state these Saṃhitās, is the same as the Brahman, the truth, the eye of the manifested universe. These mythologies develop into more complex stories about Agni's origins in the later layers of Vedic texts, such as in section 2.1.2 of the Taittiriya Brahmana and sections 2.2.3–4 of Shatapatha Brahmana.

Agni is originally conceptualized as the ultimate source of the "creator-maintainer-destroyer" triad, then one of the trinities, as the one who ruled the earth. His twin brother Indra ruled the atmosphere as the god of storm, rain and war, while Sūrya ruled the sky and heavens. His position and importance evolves over time, in the "creator-maintainer-destroyer" aspects of existence in Hindu thought.

The Shatapatha Brahmana mentions there have been three previous Agnis and current one is the fourth in the series.Fourfold, namely, was Agni (fire) at first. Now that Agni whom they at first chose for the office of Hotri priest passed away. He also whom they chose the second time passed away. He also whom they chose the third time passed away. Thereupon the one who still constitutes the fire in our own time, concealed himself from fear. He entered into the waters. Him the gods discovered and brought forcibly away from the waters. – 1:2:3:1

Texts
Vedas

In the Vedic pantheon, Agni occupies, after Indra, the most important position. Agni is prominent in the hymns of the Vedas and particularly the Brahmanas. In the ṚgVeda there are over 200 hymns that praise Agni. His name or synonyms appear in nearly a third of 1,028 hymns in the ṚgVeda. The ṚgVeda opens with a hymn inviting Agni, who is then addressed later in the hymn as the guardian of Ṛta (Dharma).

The Vedas describe the parents of Agni as two kindling fire sticks, whose loving action creates him. Just born, he is poetically presented as a tender baby, who needs loving attention lest he vanishes. With care, he sparks and smokes, then flames and grows stronger than his parents, finally so strong that he devours what created him.

The hymns in these ancient texts refer to Agni with numerous epithets and synonyms, such as Jātavedas (he who knows all generations), Vaiśvānara (relating to all men), Tanūnapāt (son of himself, self-made), Narāśaṃsa (who embodies men's praise), Tripatsya (with three dwellings), and many others. In Vedic mythologies, Agni is also presented as one who is mysterious with a tendency to play hide and seek, not just with humans but with the gods. He hides in strange places such as waters where in one myth he imbues life force into living beings that dwell therein, and in another where the fishes report his presence to the gods.

Agni is in hymn 10.124 of the ṚgVeda, a Rishi (sage-poet-composer) and along with Indra and Sūrya makes up the Vedic triad of deities.

Agni is considered equivalent to and henotheistically identified with all the gods in the Vedic thought, which formed the foundation for the various non-dualistic and monistic theologies of Hinduism. These theme of equivalence is repeatedly presented in the Vedas, such as with the following words in the Maṇḍala 1 of the ṚgVeda:
They call it Indra, Mitra, Varuna, Agni,
and he is heavenly-winged Garutman.
To what is One, sages give many a title,
they call it Agni, Yama, Matarisvan.
  — ṚgVeda 1.164.46, Translator: Klaus Klostermaier

Upanishads

Agni features prominently in the major and minor Upanishads of Hinduism. Among the earliest mention is the legend of a boy named Satyakāma Jābāla, of uncertain parentage from an unwed mother, in chapter 4 of the Chhāndogya Upanishad (~700 BCE). He honestly admits his poverty and that his mother does not know who his father was, an honesty that earns him a spot in a Vedic school (gurukul).Max Muller, Chandogya Upanishad 4.4 – 4.9, The Upanishads, Part I, Oxford University Press, pages 60–64 with footnotes During his studies, the boy meets Agni, who then becomes the metaphor for him as a cardinal direction, world body, eye and knowledge, and the abstract principle of Brahman which the Upanishad states is in everything and is everywhere.Robert Hume, Chandogya Upanishad 4.4 – 4.9, The Thirteen Principal Upanishads, Oxford University Press, pages 218–221 Agni appears in section 1.13 of Chandogya Upanishad as well.

In verse 18 of the Isha Upanishad, Agni is invoked with, "O Agni, you know all the paths, lead me on to success by the good path, keep me away from the wrong path of sin". In sections 4.5–6 of the Maitri Upanishad, students ask their Vedic Guru (teacher) about which god is best among gods they name, a list that includes Agni. The Guru replies that they are all supreme, all merely forms of the Brahman, the whole world is Brahman. So pick anyone, suggests the Upanishad, meditate and adore that one, then meditate over them all, then deny and discard the individuality of every one of these gods including of Agni, thus journey unto the universal, for a communion with the Purusha, the Ātman.

Sections 3 and 4 of Kena Upanishad, another major ancient Upanishad, present an allegorical story which includes gods Agni, Vāyu, Indra and goddess Umā. After a battle between good gods and evil demons, where Brahman helps the good gain victory, the gods wonder, "what is this Brahman, a wonderful being?" Agni goes first to find out, but fails. Vāyu too fails. Then Indra tries, but meets the goddess who already understands Brahman, explains what Brahman is and how the good reached victory through the nature of Brahman.Kena Upanishad Mantra 12, G Prasadji (Translator), pages 23–26 Indra shares this knowledge with Agni and Vayu. The Kena Upanishad closes these sections by stating that "Agni, Vāyu and Indra" are revered first because they were the first among gods to realize Brahman.Charles Johnston, Kena Upanishad in The Mukhya Upanishads: Books of Hidden Wisdom, (1920–1931), The Mukhya Upanishads, Kshetra Books,  (Reprinted in 2014), Archive of Kena Upanishad – Part 3 as published in Theosophical Quarterly, pages 229–232 The allegorical legend, states Paul Deussen, aims to teach that all the Vedic gods and natural phenomenon have their basis in the timeless, universal monistic principle called Brahman.

Another ancient major Hindu scripture named Prashna Upanishad mentions Agni in its second Prashna (question section). The section states that Agni and other deities manifest as five gross constituents that combine to make the entire universe, and that all the deities are internalized in the temple of a living body with Agni as the eyes.Robert Hume, Prasna Upanishad, Thirteen Principal Upanishads, Oxford University Press, pages 381–382

Agni is mentioned in many minor Upanishads, such as the Pranagnihotra Upanishad, the Yogatattva Upanishad, the Yogashikha Upanishad, the Trishikhibrahmana Upanishad and others. The syncretic and monistic Shaivism text, namely Rudrahridaya Upanishad states that Rudra is same as Agni, and Uma is same as Svaha.

Mundaka Upanishad (2.4) mentioned the seven tongues of Agni as kālī, karālī, manojavā, sulohita, sudhāmravarṇā, sphuliṅginī and visvarucī.

Significance
Vedic rituals involve Agni. He is a part of many Hindu rites-of-passage ceremonies such as celebrating a birth (lighting a lamp), prayers (aarti lamp), at weddings (the yajna where the bride and groom circle the fire seven times) and at death (cremation). According to Atharvaveda, it is Agni that conveys the soul of the dead from the pyre to be reborn in the next world or life. However, this role was in post-Vedic texts subsumed in the role of god Yama. Agni has been important in temple architecture, is typically present in the southeast corner of a Hindu temple.

Rites of passage: Hindu wedding

The most important ritual of Hindu weddings is performed around Agni. It is called the Saptapadi (Sanskrit for "seven steps/feet") or Sat Phere, and it represents the legal part of Hindu marriage.Office of the Registrar General, Government of India (1962), v. 20, pt. 6, no. 2, Manager of Publications, Government of India, On Hindu wedding rituals The ritual involves a couple completing seven actual or symbolic circuits around the Agni, which is considered a witness to the vows they make to each other. Each circuit of the consecrated fire is led by either the bride or the groom, varying by community and region. With each circuit, the couple makes a specific vow to establish some aspect of a happy relationship and household for each other, with Agni as the divine witness to those mutual vows. In Central India and Suriname, the bride leads the first three or four circuits.

Rituals: Agnihotra

The Agnihotra involves fire, and the term refers to the ritual of keeping fire at home, and in some cases making "sacrificial offerings" such as milk and seeds to this fire. The Srauta texts state that it is the duty of man to perform Agnihotra. A wide range of Agnihotra procedures are found in the Brahmana layer of the Vedas, ranging from the most common simple keeping of sacred fire and its symbolism, to more complicated procedures for the expiation of guilt, to rituals claimed to grant immortality to the performer. According to the Jaiminiya Brahmana, for example, an Agnihotra sacrifice frees the performer from evil and death. In contrast, states the Shatapatha Brahmana, Agnihotra is a symbolic reminder and equivalent to the Sun, where the fire keeper is reminded of the heat that creates life, the fire in beings, the heat in the womb behind the cycle of life.

Festivals: Holi and Diwali

Two major festivals in Hinduism, namely Holi (festival of colors) and Diwali (festival of lights) incorporate Agni in their ritual grammar, as a symbol of divine energy. During the autumn celebrations of Diwali, traditional small fire lamps called Diya are included to mark the festivities. For Holi, Hindus burn bonfires as Holika, on the night before the spring festival. The bonfire marks god Agni, and in rural India mothers carry their babies around the fire clockwise on Holika in Agni's remembrance.

Forms
Agni has two forms: Jataveda and Kravyada:
 Jātaveda is the fire that carries the quid-pro-quo offerings to the gods, in which case Agni is light identified with knowledge and with Brahman. In the Jātaveda form, "He who knows all creatures", Agni acts as the divine model for the priest. He is the messenger who carries the oblation from humans to the gods, bringing the Gods to sacrifice, and intercedes between gods and humans (Rig Veda I.26.3). Together with Indra and Soma, Agni is invoked in the Rig Veda more than any other gods.
 Kravyād (क्रव्याद) is the form of Agni which cremates corpses, the fire of the funeral pyre that triggers the recycling of matter and spirit. In this way, states Shatapatha Brahmana in verse 2.2.4.8, after one's death and at the time of cremation, Agni heats up and burns only the body, yet by its heat, one is reborn.

Symbolism
Agni is symbolism for psychological and physiological aspects of life, states Maha Purana section LXVII.202–203. There are three kinds of Agni inside every human being, states this text, the krodha-agni or "fire of anger", the kama-agni or "fire of passion and desire", and the udara-agni or "fire of digestion". These respectively need introspective and voluntary offerings of forgiveness, detachment and fasting, if one desires spiritual freedom and liberation.

Agni variously denotes the natural element fire, the supernatural deity symbolized by fire and the inner natural will aspiring for the highest knowledge.

Heat, combustion and energy is the realm of Agni which symbolizes the transformation of the gross to the subtle; Agni is the life-giving energy. Agnibija is the consciousness of tapas (proto-cosmic energy); agni (the energizing principle); the sun, representing the Reality (Brahman) and the Truth (Satya), is Rta, the order, the organizing principle of everything that is.

Agni, who is addressed as Atithi ('guest'), is also called Jatavedasam (जातवेदसम्), meaning "the one who knows all things that are born, created or produced". He symbolizes will-power united with wisdom.

Agni is the essence of the knowledge of Existence. Agni destroys ignorance and all delusions, removes nescience. The Kanvasatpathabrahmanam (SB.IV.i.iv.11) calls Agni "wisdom" (मेधायैमनसेऽग्नये स्वाहेति). Agni is symbolism for "the mind swiftest among (all) those that fly".

Iconography

The iconography of Agni varies by region. The design guidelines and specifications of his iconography are described in the Hindu Agama texts. He is shown with one to three heads, two to four arms, is typically red-complexioned or smoky-grey complexioned standing next to or riding a ram, with a characteristic dramatic halo of flames leaping upwards from his crown. He is shown as a strong looking man, sometimes bearded, with a large belly because he eats everything offered into his flames, with golden brown hair, eyes and mustache to match the color of fire.

Agni holds a rosary in one hand to symbolize his prayer-related role, and a sphere in another hand in eastern states of India. In other regions, his four arms hold an ax, torch, spoon (or fan) and a flaming spear (or rosary).

Seven rays of light or flames emit from his body. One of his names is Saptajihva, "the one having seven tongues", to symbolize how rapidly he consumes sacrificial butter. Occasionally, Agni iconography is shown in Rohitasva form, which has no ram as his vahana, but where he is pulled in a chariot with seven red horses, and the symbolic wind that makes fire move as the wheels of the chariot. In Khmer art, Agni has been depicted with a rhinoceros as his vahana. The number seven symbolizes his reach in all seven mythical continents in ancient Hindu cosmology or colors of a rainbow in his form as the sun.

Agni has three forms, namely fire, lightning, and the Sun, forms sometimes symbolized by giving his icon three heads or three legs. He sometimes is shown wearing a garland of fruits or flowers, symbolic of the offerings made into the fire.

History

The earliest surviving artwork of Agni have been found at archaeological sites near Mathura (Uttar Pradesh), and these date from 1st-century BCE. In the collection at Bharat Kalā Bhavan, there is a red sandstone sculpture from around the start of the common era but no later than 1st-century CE, identifiable as Agni shown in the garb of a Brahmin, very much like sage Kashyapa. In the Panchala coins of Agnimitra, a deity is always present with a halo of flames. In Gupta sculptures, Agni is found with a halo of flames round the body, the sacred thread across his chest, a beard, pot-bellied and holding in his right hand a amrtaghata (nectar-pot). Many of these early carvings and early statues show just one head, but elaborate details such as ear-rings made of three fruits, a detailed necklace, a slightly smiling face wearing a crown, and flames engraved into the hairs at the back of Agni's statue.

The iconographic statues and reliefs of god Agni are typically present in the southeast corners of a Hindu temple. However, in rare temples where Agni is envisioned as a presiding astrological divinity, according to texts such as the Samarangana Sutradhara, he is assigned the northeast corner.

Agni is historically considered to be present in every grihastha (home), and therein presented in one of three forms – gārhapatya (for general domestic usage), āhavaniya (for inviting and welcoming a personage or deity) and dakshinagni (for fighting against all evil). Yāska states that his predecessor Sākapuṇi regarded the threefold existence of Agni as being in earth, air and heaven as stated by the Rig Veda, but a Brāhmana considered the third manifestation to be the Sun.

Mythologies

A sage of the Ṛg Veda (Sūkta IV.iii.11) states that the Sun became visible when Agni was born.

Epics
Offended by Agni, Bhṛgu had cursed Agni to become the devourer of all things on this earth, but Brahma modified that curse and made Agni the purifier of all things he touched.

In the "Khāṇḍava-daha Parva" (Mahābhārata CCXXV), Agni in disguise approaches Krishna and Arjuna seeking sufficient food for gratification of his hunger; and on being asked about the kind of food which would gratify, Agni expressed the desire to consume the forest of Khāṇḍava protected by Indra for the sake of Takṣaka, the chief of the Nāgas. Aided by Krishna and Arjuna, Agni consumes the Khāṇḍava Forest, which burnt for fifteen days, sparing only Aswasena, Maya, and the four birds called sarangakas; later, as a boon Arjuna got all his weapons from Indra and also the bow, Gāṇḍīva, from Varuṇa.

There is the story about King Shibi who was tested by Agni assuming the form of a pigeon and by Indra assuming the form of a hawk; Shibi offered his own flesh to the hawk in exchange of pigeon's life. The pigeon which had sought Shibi's shelter was thus saved by the king's sacrifice.Agniparīkṣā or 'the Fire test' has Agni as the witness. In the Rāmāyaṇa, Sītā voluntarily goes through this ordeal to prove her virtue.

Puranas
Agni is the eldest son of Brahma. In the Viṣṇu Purāṇa, Agni, called Abhimāni is said to have sprung from the mouth of the Virāt Puruṣa, the Cosmic Man. In another version, Agni emerged from the ritual fire produced by the wife of Dharma (eternal law) named Vasubhāryā (literally, "daughter of Light").

According to the Puranic mythology, Agni married Svāhā (invocation offering) and fathered three sons – Pāvaka (purifier), Pāvamāna (purifying) and Śuchi (purity). From these sons, he has forty-five grandchildren which are symbolic names of different aspects of a fire. In some texts, Medhā (intelligence) is Agni's sister.

Relationships

Wife and children
Goddess Svāhā is Agni's wife. Her name is pronounced with offerings such as butter and seeds poured into the fire during ceremonies. However, like many names in Hindu traditions, the name Svāhā embeds symbolic meanings, through its relationship with the Vedic word Svadhā found in the hymns of the ṚgVeda. Thomas Coburn states that the term Svadhā refers to "one's own particular nature or inclination", and the secondary sense of "a customary pleasure or enjoyment, a refreshment that nourishes". Svāhā is also found in the hymns of the Vedic literature, in the sense of "welcome, praise to you". This salutation is a remembrance of Agni, as an aspect of that which is "the source of all beings". As a goddess and wife of Agni, Svāhā represents this Shakti.

In the text Devi Māhātmya of the goddess tradition of Hinduism (Shaktism), and in the Hindu mythologies, Svāhā is the daughter of Daksha, Svāhā has a crush for Agni. She seduces him by successively impersonating six of seven women at a gurukul (school) that Agni desired for, and thus with him has a baby who grows to become god Skanda – the god of war. Other chapters suggest he was the son of the god Shiva.

The Mahābhārata also mentions that when Agni was residing at Mahishmati he fell in love with the daughter of king Nila. In the guise of a Brahmana, he asked for the hand of the princess, but the king refused and was about to punish him. Agni revealed his true form and flamed up in wrath. The frightened king apologized and bestowed his daughter on Agni. In return, Agni promised protection of the city during any invasion.

Other gods
Agni is identified with same characteristics, equivalent personality or stated to be identical as many major and minor gods in different layers of the Vedic literature, including Vāyu, Soma, Rudra (Shiva), Varuṇa and Mitra. In hymn 2.1 of the ṚgVeda, in successive verses, Agni is identified to be the same as twelve gods and five goddesses.

Some of the gods that Agni is identified with:
 Prajāpati: The vedic text Shatapatha Brahmana, in section 6.1.2 describes how and why Prajāpati is the father of Agni, and also the son of Agni, because they both are the image of the one Ātman (Soul, Self) that was, is and will be the true, eternal identity of the universe. The Prajāpati, cosmic Purusha and Agni are stated to be the same in sections 6.1.1 and 6.2.1 of Shatapatha Brahmana.
 Varuṇa and Mitra: when Agni is born, he is Varuṇa; when he is kindled, he is Mitra. He is also stated to become Varuṇa in the evening, and he is Mitra when he rises in the morning.
 Indra: Agni is generally presented as Indra's twin, they both go and appear together. In chapter 13.3 of the Atharvaveda, Agni is said to become Indra when he illumines the sky. Agni is also called Vishva-Vedāh, "dawn," which refers both to Indra, the Protector, and to the all-knowing Agni.
 Rudra: in the ṚgVeda Agni is addressed as having the same fierce nature as Rudra. The Shiva-linga represents that pillar of fire which is Agni, a Skambha symbolism borrowed in some Buddhist artworks. The verses 8 through 18 in section 6.1.3 of the Shatapatha Brahmana state Rudra is same as Agni, who is known by many other names. Later, in section 9.1.1, the Shatapatha Brahmana states, "this entire Agni (fire altar) has now been completed, he is now this god Rudra".
 Savitr (Sun): Agni is same as Savitr during the day, as he traverses the space delivering light and energy to all living beings.
 Vāyu and Soma: in the Vedas, Agni or 'fire' (light and heat), Vāyu or 'air' (energy and action), and Soma or 'water', are major deities who cooperate to empower all life. In some passages, they are stated to be aspects of the same energy and principle that transforms.
 Gāyatrī: is identified with Agni in Aitareya Brahmana section 1.1, Jaiminiya Brahmana section 3.184 and Taittiriya Brahmana section 7.8, and the most revered Gayatri meter in the Sanskrit prosody and Hindu traditions is associated with Agni.
 Vāc (goddess of speech) and Prāṇa (life force): are identified with Agni in Jaiminiya Brahmana sections 1.1 and 2.54, Shatapatha Brahmana sections 2.2.2 and 3.2.2.
 Sarama: in a hymn in praise of Agni, Rishi Parāśara Śāktya speaks of Saramā, the goddess of Intuition, the forerunner of the dawn of Truth in the Human mind, who finds the Truth which is lost. It is Saramā who is a power of the Truth, whose cows are the rays of the dawn of illumination and who awakens man who finds Agni standing in the supreme seat and goal.

Buddhism
Canonical textsAgni (Sanskrit; Pali; Aggi) appears in many Buddhist canonical texts, as both a god as well as a metaphor for the element of heart or fire. In Pali literature, he is also called Aggi-Bhagavā, Jātaveda, and Vessānara.The Aggi-Vacchagotta Sutta, presents a philosophical exchange between Buddha and a wandering ascetic named Śreṇika Vatsagotra (Sanskrit; Pali: Senika Vacchagotta). The conversation between Buddha and Śreṇika have remained a part of a debate that continues in modern Buddhism. It is called the Śreṇika heresy (Traditional Chinese: 先尼外道; Pinyin: Xiānní wàidào; Romaji: Sennigedō 先尼外道).

Śreṇika suggested that there is an eternal Self (Atman) that lives in a temporary physical body and is involved in rebirth. In the Buddhist traditions, the Buddha taught there is rebirth and Anātman, or that there is no eternal Self. The Pali texts state that Śreṇika disagreed and asked the Buddha many questions, which the Buddha refused to answer, calling his questions as indeterminate. The Buddha clarified that were he to answer Śreṇika's questions, it would "entangle" him. The Buddha explains the Dharma with Agni as a metaphor, stating that just like fire is extinguished and no longer exists after it is extinguished, in the same way all skandha that constitute a human being are extinguished after death. Different versions of this debate appear throughout scripture across traditions, such as the Mahāparinibbāṇa Sutta, and the Mahāprajñāpāramitōpadeśa. In some versions, Śreṇika offers his own simile of Agni to further his views. Scholars such as Nagarjuna have extensively commented on the Śreṇika heresy.

In a manner similar to the Hindu texts, the Buddhist texts also treat Agni (referred to as the fire element Tejas) as a fundamental material and building block of nature. For example, in section 11.31 of the Visuddhimagga as well as the Rūpakaṇḍa section of the Dhammasangani, Agni and Tejas are credited as that which warms, ages, burns and digests food and life processes.

Art
Agni is featured prominently in the art of the Mahayana tradition.

In Tibet, he is one of the fifty-one Buddhist deities found in the mandala of medicine Buddha. He appears in Tibetan  Manjushri's mandalas as well, where he is depicted with Brahma and Indra. The Tibetan iconography for Agni strongly resembles that found in the Hindu tradition, with elements such as red-colored skin, a goat vehicle, conical hair and crown, a beard, and wielding a pot of water or fire in one hand, and rosary beads in the other. Such art will often include Buddhist themes such as the dharma wheel, white conch, golden fish, elephant, the endless knot.

In Theravada traditions, such as that found in Thailand, Agni is a minor deity. Agni is called Phra Phloeng (also spelled Phra Plerng, literally, "holy flames"). He is commonly depicted with two faces, eight arms, red in color, wearing a headdress in the shape of a gourd, and emitting flames. Medieval era Thai literature describes him as a deity with seven tongues, a purple crown of smoke, and fiery complexion. He rides a horse chariot, a rhinoceros or a ram. Phra Phloeng's wife in these texts is stated to be Subanee, Garudee, or Swaha. Some Thai texts state Nilanon to be their son.

In East Asian Buddhism, Agni is a dharmapāla and often classed as one of a group of twelve deities (Japanese: Jūniten, 十二天) grouped together as directional guardians.

In Japan, he is called "Katen" (火天). He is included with the other eleven devas, which include Taishakuten (Śakra/Indra), Fūten (Vāyu), Emmaten (Yama), Rasetsuten (Nirṛti/Rākṣasa), Ishanaten (Īśāna), Bishamonten (Vaiśravaṇa/Kubera), Suiten (Varuṇa) Bonten (Brahmā), Jiten (Pṛthivī), Nitten (Sūrya/Āditya), and Gatten (Candra). While iconography varies, he is often depicted as an elderly mountain ascetic with two or three legs, and two or four arms.

Jainism

The word Agni in Jainism refers to fire, but not in the sense of Vedic ideas. Agni appears in Jain thought, as a guardian deity and in its cosmology. He is one of the eight dikpalas, or directional guardian deities in Jain temples, along with these seven: Indra, Yama, Nirrti, Varuna, Vayu, Kubera and Isana. They are typically standing, with their iconography is similar to those found in Hindu and Buddhist temple pantheon.

In ancient Jain thought, living beings have souls and exist in myriad of realms, and within the earth realm shared by human beings, there are two kinds of beings: mobile and immobile. The mobile beings – which includes tiny insects, birds, aquatic life, animals and human beings – have two or more senses, while the immobile beings have only a single sense (ekenderiya). Among the single sense beings are plant beings, air beings (whirlwind), earth beings (clay), water beings (dew drop) and fire beings (burning coal, meteor, lightning). The last class of beings are Agni-bodies, and these are believed to contain soul and fire-bodied beings. Ahimsa, or non-violence, is the highest precept in Jainism. In their spiritual pursuits, Jain monks go to great lengths to practice Ahimsa; they neither start Agni nor extinguish Agni because doing so is considered violent to "fire beings" and an act that creates harmful Karma.Agni-kumara or "fire princes" are a part of Jain theory of rebirth and a class of reincarnated beings. Agni or Tejas are terms used to describe substances and concepts that create beings, and in which transmigrating soul gets bound according to Jainism theology.

Ancient medicine and food

Agni, as constitutive principle of fire or heat, was incorporated in Hindu texts of ancient medicine such as the Charaka Samhita and Sushruta Samhita. It is, along with Soma, the two classification premises in the pre-4th century CE medical texts found in Hinduism and Buddhism. Agni-related category, states Dominik Wujastyk, included that of "hot, fiery, dry or parched" types, while Soma-related category included "moist, nourishing, soothing and cooling" types. This classification system was a basis of grouping medicinal herbs, seasons of the year, tastes and foods, empirical diagnosis of human illnesses, veterinary medicine, and many other aspects of health and lifestyle.

Agni was viewed as the life force in a healthy body, the power to digest foods, and innate in food. In Ayurveda, states Fleischman, "the amount of Agni determines the state of health".

Agni is an important entity in Ayurveda. Agni is the fiery metabolic energy of digestion, allows assimilation of food while ridding the body of waste and toxins, and transforms dense physical matter into subtle forms of energy the body needs. Jathar-agni determines the production of hydrochloric acid in the stomach, Bhuta-agni determines the production of bile in the liver, Kloma-agni determines the production of sugar-digesting pancreatic enzymes and so forth. The nature and quality of these agnis depend on one's dosha which can be – vata, pitta or kapha.

Agni is also known as Vaisvanara''. Just as the illuminating power in the fire is a part of Agni's own effulgence, even so the heating power in the foods digestive and appetizing power is also a part of Agni's energy or potency.

See also
Agneya, Agni's daughter
Atar, Zoroastrian yazata of fire
Ugnis, fire in Lithuanian etymology
Eternal flame
Hestia, Greek goddess of the hearth
Kamui Fuchi, Ainu fire goddess
Mātariśvan
Vahagn, Armenian god of fire and war
Vesta, Roman goddess of the hearth

Notes

References

Works cited

External links

 
 
 
 
 
 
 

Classical elements
Fire gods
Fire in Hindu worship
Hindu gods
Lokapala
Messenger gods
Rigvedic deities